Kristopher Faulds (born 3 July 1994) is a Scottish professional footballer who last played as a midfielder for Scottish Lowland League side East Stirlingshire.

Early life
He attended Braes High School and graduated in May 2012.

Career
Faulds made his first team debut aged 17, on 25 February 2012, playing the full 90 minutes in Falkirk's 3–0 win over Queen of the South in the Scottish First Division.

On 29 November 2013, Faulds signed on loan for Scottish League One side Stenhousemuir until 31 January 2014. On 4 February 2014, the loan was extended until the end of the season.

In April 2014, Falkirk manager Gary Holt told Faulds that his Falkirk contract was not to be extended, and that he was free to leave and find himself a new club.

After a year with Stenhousemuir, whom he had previously been on loan with, Faulds was released by the "Warriors" and signed for Scottish League Two side East Stirlingshire in June 2015 but left the club in 2019.

Career statistics

References

External links

Living people
1994 births
Association football midfielders
Falkirk F.C. players
Stenhousemuir F.C. players
East Stirlingshire F.C. players
Scottish Football League players
Scottish Professional Football League players
Scottish footballers